Archduchess Maria Josepha of Austria (Maria Josepha Gabriella Johanna Antonia Anna; 19 March 1751 – 15 October 1767) was the twelfth child and ninth daughter of Francis I, Holy Roman Emperor, and Empress Maria Theresa. She was engaged to King Ferdinand IV of Naples and Sicily, but the marriage never materialised due to Maria Josepha’s death due smallpox. She was buried in the Imperial Crypt in Vienna, Austria.

Early life and betrothal

Childhood 

Maria Josepha was born on 19 March 1751 at the Hofburg Palace in Vienna, Austria, as the ninth daughter of Emperor Francis I and Empress Maria Theresa. By birth, she was entitled to the position of Archduchess of Austria, as her other siblings were. Maria Josepha was the favourite of her brother, Archduke Joseph.

Maria Josepha was very close to her sister Maria Johanna, whom was born only a year before her in February 1750. The two sisters were raised and educated together, and had the same tutors. Maria Josepha and Maria Johanna "developed satisfactory, worked hard at their lessons and were involved in numerous festivities in which they participated enthusiastically."

After the death of her sister-in-law Princess Isabella of Parma, Maria Josepha was the most important female at court after her mother, niece and sister. She lost that position during May 1767 when her elder brother, Archduke Joseph, married his second cousin Maria Josepha of Bavaria.

Betrothal 
Empress Maria Theresa wanted her fourth eldest surviving daughter, Archduchess Maria Amalia, to marry King Ferdinand of Naples and Sicily for political reasons; however, after Ferdinand's father Charles III of Spain objected to the five-year age difference, Maria Josepha, as the next eldest daughter, was left as the next candidate for Ferdinand's hand in marriage. She and Ferdinand were the same age, and Maria Josepha was considered "delightfully pretty, pliant by nature”.

Death 

Maria Josepha had been terrified of dying of smallpox ever since the death of her elder sister Archduchess Maria Johanna Gabriela in 1762. Her fears were realised when she died of smallpox on the very day she was to have left Vienna for her journey across the Alps to marry Ferdinand. Popular belief holds that she contracted smallpox because her mother, Maria Theresa, insisted that she go and pray at the improperly sealed tomb of her sister-in-law, Empress Maria Josepha, whom had recently died of the disease—because they shared the same name. However, the rash appeared two days after Maria Josepha visited the vault, and there is an incubation period of about one week after initial infection before symptoms of a rash appear.  Therefore, the archduchess must have been infected before visiting the vault.

On 15 October 1767, at the age of 16, Maria Josepha died due to the disease. She is buried in vault number 46 at the Imperial Crypt Vaults of the Imperial Crypt in Vienna. After her death, her younger sister, Archduchess Maria Carolina, was given as a bride to the king of Naples in her place.

Ancestry

References

Bibliography 

 
 

1751 births
1767 deaths
18th-century Austrian people
18th-century Austrian women
House of Habsburg-Lorraine
Deaths from smallpox
Infectious disease deaths in Austria
Burials at the Imperial Crypt
Austrian princesses
Knights of the Order of Saint Stephen of Hungary
Daughters of emperors
Children of Maria Theresa
Royalty and nobility who died as children
Daughters of kings